Kidz in da Hood (Swedish title: Förortsungar lit. "Suburb kids") is a 2006 Swedish film directed by Catti Edfeldt and Ylva Gustavsson.

The film is also known as F.O.U. in Sweden (promotional abbreviation).

This is the story of Amina, a girl from Sierra Leone seeking asylum in Sweden. The second key figure in the story is Headbanger Johan, played by Gustaf Skarsgård. The film is about how their paths cross - a meeting that will change both their lives forever.

Filming took place in Fittja and began on 21 November 2005.

The film won five Guldbagge Awards in 2007 in the categories Best Film, Best Director, Best Screenplay, Best Actor and Best performance for which the jury put it, "attitude and rocking the music."

Cast 
 Beylula Kidane Adgoy as Amina
 Gustaf Skarsgård as Johan
 Embla Hjulström as Mirre
 Jennifer Brown as Janet
 Sanna Ekman as Maggan
 Sunil Munshi as Jesper
 Hannu Kiaviaho as Pecka
 Teodor Runsjö as Micke
 Jonathan Kurkson as Hassan
 Alejandro Castillo as Antonio
 Dogge Doggelito as Viktor
 Ahmadu Jah as Said
 Fredrik Eddari as Ali
 Olle Sarri as Berra
 Douglas Johansson as Social chef
 Peter Jezewski as Johnny
 Jacob Mohlin as Cop
 Marienette Dahlin as Cop
 Cesar Fulgencio as Teacher
 Majken Pollack as Doctor
 Eduardo Grutzky as Restaurant chef
 Christopher Mhina as Marco

Soundtrack

External links 
 
 

2006 films
Swedish comedy-drama films
2000s Swedish-language films
2000s musical comedy-drama films
Best Film Guldbagge Award winners
Films whose director won the Best Director Guldbagge Award
Hood films
2006 comedy films
Swedish musical comedy-drama films
2000s Swedish films